Crab in oyster sauce or oyster sauce crab is a Chinese seafood dish of crab served in savoury oyster sauce. It is a popular dish in Asia, that can be found from China, Indonesia, Singapore to the Philippines.

Origin
Crab in oyster sauce can trace its origin to Southern China's Cantonese cuisine, more precisely, after the development of oyster sauce in the late 19th century. The dish then spread across Asia. Known in Indonesia as kepiting saus tiram, it is a popular seafood in Chinese Indonesian cuisine, being one of the two most popular ways of serving crab.

Ingredients
The most popular crab species used in this recipe is mud crab, though blue crab may also be used.

The crabs are cut into pieces and stir-fried shortly in a wok on strong fire in cooking oil and water, garlic, ginger, onion and scallion, mixed with oyster sauce, soy sauce, ang ciu (Chinese cooking wine) and sugar. Then the sauce is thickened with a corn starch and water mixture. The mild umami (savoury) seafood flavour of oyster sauce tends to enhance the natural flavour of the crab.

See also

 Crab in Padang sauce
 Chili crab
 Black pepper crab
 Chinese Indonesian cuisine
 List of crab dishes
 List of seafood dishes
 Peranakan cuisine

References

External links
 Stir-fried Crabs with Oyster Sauce recipe
 Kepiting Saus Tiram recipe 

Cantonese cuisine
Indonesian Chinese cuisine
Oyster sauce
Oyster dishes
Indonesian seafood dishes